NNK Rugby Stadium is a multi-use stadium, situated in the Parow suburb of Cape Town, at the Western Cape Province in South Africa. Previously it was mostly used for rugby matches. Since September 2010, where the stadium became the new home venue for the National First Division club FC Cape Town, it has mainly been used to host football matches.

External links
Official website for FC Cape Town -with info about NNK Rugby Stadium

References

Soccer venues in South Africa
Rugby union stadiums in South Africa
Sports venues in Cape Town